Michael Colle ( "Cole"; born February 1, 1945) is a Canadian politician who has represented Ward 8 Eglinton—Lawrence on Toronto City Council since the 2018 election. Colle served in the Legislative Assembly of Ontario from 1995 to 2018 and was a Cabinet minister during Premier Dalton McGuinty's tenure. He was formerly a York city councillor and Metro Toronto councillor, where he sat as the chair of the Toronto Transit Commission (TTC) from 1991 to 1994.

Background
Colle moved to Canada at a young age, and was educated at Carleton University. He worked as a teacher of history and economics for eighteen years, including several years at Michael Power High School and St. Michael's College School in Toronto, Ontario.

His son Josh was a member of Toronto City Council between 2010 and 2018.

Politics

Early political career
Colle served on the City of York council for Ward 2 from 1982 to 1985, and on the Metro Toronto Council representing York Eglinton from 1988 to 1994. He was also chair of the Toronto Transit Commission from 1991 to 1994.

Provincial politics

Colle was elected to the Ontario legislature in the 1995 provincial election, defeating incumbent Tony Rizzo in the riding of Oakwood. In 1996, Colle supported Dwight Duncan's unsuccessful bid to become Ontario Liberal Party leader. In the 1999 provincial election, Colle defeated incumbent John Parker in the redistributed riding of Eglinton—Lawrence.  The Ontario Progressive Conservative (PC) Party won both elections, and Colle sat in opposition during this period.

Backbench
Colle championed environmental causes during his time in the legislature including the protection of the Oak Ridges Moraine. He was a co-chair of Mel Lastman's 1997 bid to become Mayor of Toronto.

2003 election
The Liberals won the 2003 election. Colle was re-elected in Eglinton—Lawrence.

Cabinet 
Colle was named to cabinet on June 29, 2005 as Minister of Citizenship and Immigration. From October 2007 to February 2010 he was Chief Government Whip.

He was criticized for his role in giving out $32 million in government grants to immigrant and cultural groups without official applications or formal statements of purpose. In one case that the auditor general highlighted, the Ontario Cricket Association received $1 million when it asked for $150,000. Premier McGuinty agreed to commission a special report on the matter, to be released in July 2007. Colle was to appear before the Standing Committee on Estimates before the Legislature was prorogued by the premier. Some believe this was arranged to prevent his testimony from going public. On July 26, 2007, Colle resigned as Minister of Citizenship and Immigration. Gerry Phillips was sworn in as the new Minister of Citizenship and Immigration, in addition to his responsibilities as Minister of Government Services.

2007 election 
In the 2007 provincial election, Colle was re-elected to serve his fourth term to represent Eglinton—Lawrence. 

On February 24, 2009, Colle introduced the Zero Tolerance to Violence on Public Transit Act, 2009 in an attempt to address the growing incidence of gun violence on Toronto public transit.

On March 25, 2009 Colle appeared to buck his own party by introducing Bill 160: The Caregiver and Foreign Worker Recruitment Act, 2009. This was in response to a Toronto Star report on the abuse of foreign nannies.  After some initial reluctance by the government, Colle was able to convince the labour minister and the government to intervene. The government committed to introducing legislation to license "nanny brokers", ban placement fees, and post licensed placement agencies on an online registry.

The McGuinty government introduced Bill 210, Employment Protection for Foreign Nationals Act (Live-in Caregivers and Others), 2009 (EPFNA) on October 21, 2009 and passed the "Nanny Protection Act" on December 15, 2009.

In 2010, Colle took on the issue of bedbugs eventually convincing Health Minister Deb Matthews to provide $5 million to fight the scourge with a bedbug strategy.

Colle also spent most of his fourth term advocating to get the Eglinton Crosstown LRT built. The provincial government has committed $8 billion for the new Eglinton line that runs along the southern border of his riding. Colle had advocated for the construction of the LRT following the Mike Harris government cancellation of the construction of the Eglinton West Line in 1996.

2011 election
In October 2011 he was re-elected to serve his fifth term to represent Eglinton—Lawrence. He was appointed as the Parliamentary Assistant to the Minister of Transportation and the Minister of Infrastructure. During this term Colle organized a petition requesting the addition of Oakwood station on the Eglinton Crosstown LRT line.

2014 election and 2018 defeat
In June 2014 he was re-elected to serve his sixth term to represent Eglinton—Lawrence. He served as parliamentary assistant to the minister of transportation. He was also appointed as deputy government whip.

In March 2016 Colle tabled the Tomato Act, proclaiming the tomato as the official vegetable of Ontario and designating July 15 as Tomato Day. The bill died on the order paper.

He was defeated in the 2018 provincial election.

Return to municipal politics

2018 election 
Weeks after the provincial election, Colle registered as a candidate for Toronto City Council's Ward 13 (which was essentially Ward 15 from the 2014 election, with some boundary adjustments) in the 2018 Toronto municipal election, after his son Josh Colle, the incumbent Ward 15 city councillor, announced his retirement from politics.

In the last-minute redistricting imposed by the provincial government, Wards 13 and 14 (essentially corresponding to 2014 Wards 15 and 16) became the new Ward 8, so that Colle was now running against Christin Carmichael Greb, incumbent councillor from the former Ward 16. Colle won with 14,094 votes (41% of votes in the ward) to 7,395 for Carmichael Greb.

Work on council 
In April 2019, Colle announced that he is going to introduce a motion that would ask the Alcohol and Gaming Commission of Ontario (AGCO) to suspend the liquor licence of bars where gun violence happens frequently.

In September 2020, Colle has requested that protected bike lanes be installed along Yonge Street from south of St. Clair Avenue to north of Lawrence Avenue in conjunction with on-street patios and other traffic-calming measures. The motion was approved by the city council on October 29 in a 19 to 3 vote, Councillor Stephen Holyday, one of the councillors voting against the motion, argued that approving this will create a bottleneck on an already congested thoroughfare that also serves as a vital backup artery for TTC subway replacement. Colle defended the plan claiming that the city’s goal is to move beyond people using cars to travel around the city’s core.

On October 7, 2020, Colle tabled a motion to rename Locksley Avenue, from Eglinton Avenue West to Hopewell Avenue, to Jimmy Wisdom Way. Jimmy Wisdom was a local community icon and renowned musical performer as a young man in Montego Bay, Jamaica.

Housing 
Colle advocates for the reintroduction of a speculation tax as part of a solution to address the rising price of housing in Toronto. Colle asked the province in December 2021 to introduce a tax on the sale of homes that are not principal residences in an effort to discourage speculators and "home flippers." Ontario previously had such a tax under the government of Bill Davis in the 1970s.

Colle has been described as one of "three Toronto councillors hopelessly exacerbating the housing crisis" by More Neighbours Toronto.

Electoral record

References

External links

1945 births
21st-century Canadian politicians
Carleton University alumni
Chairs of the Toronto Transit Commission
Italian emigrants to Canada
Living people
Members of the Executive Council of Ontario
Metropolitan Toronto councillors
Ontario Liberal Party MPPs
People from Foggia
People from York, Toronto
Toronto city councillors